"Mother Hitton's Littul Kittons" is a classic science fiction short story  by American writer Cordwainer Smith, first published in Galaxy Magazine in 1961, and partly based on Ali Baba and the Forty Thieves.  It is collected most recently in The Rediscovery of Man.  It details the methods by which the Norstrilians (or "Old North Australians") of Smith's fictional "Instrumentality" universe maintain their monopoly on the precious immortality drug stroon.  The story details part of the background to the novel Norstrilia (which references the Kittons once in its introduction as a sure method of death).

The story has been alluded to in Charles Stross's Glasshouse.

Background
Cordwainer Smith is a pseudonym of Paul Linebarger, the noted China expert, who wrote most of his published science-fiction stories within the setting of the Instrumentality of Mankind.  For many millennia, the rather static structure of this society (on those planets which the Instrumentality directly administered) was of Lords of the Instrumentality ruling over humans (who were allowed a fixed 400-year lifespan) and a large number of exploited animal-derived "Underpeople" servants.  The use of the immortality drug "stroon" from the world of Norstrilia was a vital tool in maintaining this order.

Norstrilia
The planet of Norstrilia, or in full the Commonwealth of Old North Australia, was settled by sheep farmers ultimately from a post-nuclear-war Australia (though with many historical vicissitudes — such as a stay on the hell-world Paradise VII — before they found their current prosperity).  The political system is based on a monarchy with "her absent majesty" the Queen as nominal head of state. However, the Queen has been lost for millennia ("But she might bloody well turn up one of these days."), and a local deputy and Commonwealth Council fulfill her role until she returns.  The organization of the planet is based on Stations, or large farm allotments passed down through generations.

Stroon
The sheep that were brought to this planet by the Australian immigrants suffer a local infection that causes them to grow larger than houses; completely immobile, they require constant attention.  The infection also generates stroon, also called the santaclara drug, which halts aging in humans.

Stroon has made Norstrilia the richest planet in the entire Instrumentality, and its people are thus targets of kidnap and theft attempts.  The citizens are highly trained in self-defense, but the planet strategically maintains "Mother Hitton's Littul Kittons" for its defense.

Viola Siderea
This is a robber planet, once rich and civilized, but now reduced to a dog-eat-dog existence which has created a ruling class of highly sophisticated thieves.  Benjacomin Bozart is a Warden of the Thieves' Guild, trained and prepared to raid Norstrilia for its stroon. Due to the impossibility of overpowering a Norstrilian adult, he ruthlessly drugs and kills a small Norstrilian boy on a vacation world to find out the nature of the planet's defenses, but the only information he gets is the name "Mother Hitton's Littul Kittons" scrawled in the sand at a beach.

He consults the Guild's encyclopedia, which says that the phrase is an archaic term for the disease caused by the stroon virus — no-one being aware that this is a cover story planted by a Norstrilian agent. Confident of obtaining the stroon, Bozart pays out immense bribes using Viola Siderea's credit to illicitly charter ships, further unaware that he is paying other Norstrilian agents who have tracked him since he murdered the child. The last leg of the journey drops his space yacht into orbit around Norstrilia.

Mother Hitton's Littul Kittons
A 21-faceted moon and a network of relay stations are placed around the planet.  Resident on the moon is Mother Hitton, a woman who is the "weapons mistress" and in charge of the care and feeding of the "Littul Kittons", which are in fact mink that have been selectively bred for centuries for psychotic, self-destructive madness. They (necessarily) spend almost all their lives under anaesthesia, only allowed to waken to mate or when needed for defense. The brain patterns of these mad mink are focused into an intense telepathic beam that can be directed at any incoming space ship from the relay station, driving all humans into a self-destructive madness — as Bozart discovers first-hand. The odd spelling of the "Littul Kittons" is intentional, as research into the term would act as a tripwire, alerting the Norstrilian defenses to potential hostile activity.

After his death the extent of the Norstrilians' revenge is revealed: Bozart's bribes have incurred a debt of 400 million man-megayears for Viola Siderea.

References

External links
 
 
eText of story

Short stories by Cordwainer Smith
1961 short stories
Works originally published in Galaxy Science Fiction